The early baroque opera L'Orfeo, composed by Claudio Monteverdi to a libretto by Alessandro Striggio the Younger, was first performed in 1607. It is Monteverdi's first opera, and one of the earliest in the new genre. In Monteverdi's hands, according to music historian Donald Jay Grout, "the new form [of opera] passed out of the experimental stage, acquiring ... a power and depth of expression that makes his music dramas still living works after more than three hundred years". In his work, Monteverdi incorporates the "speech-song" or recitative first used in Jacopo Peri's opera Dafne and Giulio Caccini's Euridice, both direct precursors of L'Orfeo, and adds solo arias, duets, ensembles, dances and instrumental interludes.

The story of the opera follows the Greek legend of Orpheus, who descends to Hades to persuade the gods of the Underworld to allow him to bring his dead bride, Eurydice, back to the living world. His plea is granted, on the condition that he does not look back while leading Eurydice out of Hades. However, fearful that he is being betrayed, Orpheus does look back and Eurydice is lost to him for ever. In an ending which departs from the myth, Orpheus is rescued from his grief by Apollo, who invites him to ascend to the heavens where he will be able to look on Eurydice's semblance in the stars. Striggio's original ending, not preserved in the first published score of 1609, followed more closely to that of the myth, in which the grieving Orpheus is set upon by wild women (maenads or Bacchantes) and dismembered (though Striggio's version does not include the bloody denouement).

Roles and voice types
Monteverdi's 1609 score includes an incomplete listing of the parts. Voice types are indicated by clef markings for each singer's part. These are generally interpretable in terms of soprano, alto, tenor and bass roles. Roles are frequently doubled, e.g. La musica and Eurydice, Ninfa and Prosperina, La messagera and Speranza, and others.
La musica (Music) (soprano, originally castrato)
Orfeo (Orpheus) (tenor)
Euridice (Eurydice) (soprano, originally castrato)
La messaggera (Silvia, the Messenger) (soprano)
Speranza (Hope) (soprano)
Caronte (Charon) (bass)
Proserpina (Proserpine) (soprano)
Plutone (Pluto) (bass)
Apollo (tenor)
Ninfa (Nymph) (soprano)
Eco (Echo) (tenor)
Ninfe e pastori (Nymphs and shepherds) (Chorus: soprano, alto, tenor, bass. Soloists: alto, two tenors)
Spiriti infernali (Infernal spirits) (Chorus: soprano, alto, tenor, bass. Soloists: tenor, bass)

List of musical and vocal items

References

Sources

Orfeo, List
Musical Items Orfeo